Nude with Boots is the 16th album by American rock band Melvins, released on July 8, 2008. A vinyl release was issued on November 3, 2009.

Track listing

"Dies Iraea" is an adaptation of the theme song from the 1980 Stanley Kubrick horror film The Shining (based on Hector Berlioz' interpretation of the "Dies Irae").

Personnel
King Buzzo – guitar, vocals
Dale Crover – drums, vocals
Jared Warren – bass guitar, vocals
Coady Willis – drums, vocals

with
Haze XXL – extra guitar and vocals, engineer

Additional personnel 
Toshi Kasai – engineer
John Golden – mastering
Mackie Osborne – artwork

References

External links
 

Melvins albums
2008 albums
Ipecac Recordings albums
Sludge metal albums